Vatomandry is a town in and the administrative center of the Vatomandry District, Atsinanana Region, Madagascar. An airport serves the city.

Etymology and location 
Located on the coast, the town's name means 'Sleeping Rocks', derived from two black rocks near the shore. It is also on the path of the Canal des Pangalanes and National Road RN 11a

History 
In the pre-colonial era of the 19th century, Vatomandry was a center of Hova government with an active port.

Cyclone Manou caused great damage in 2003 to the town and left 68 people dead.  Cyclone Giovanna in 2012 also caused significant damage.

Religion
 Roman Catholic Apostolic Prefecture of Vatomandry

Notable personalities 
 Didier Ratsiraka (1936-2021), former President of Madagascar

References 

Populated places in Atsinanana